Narayan Ghosh Mita is a Bangladeshi writer and film director. He was the first recipient of National Film Award in best director category.

Filmography

See also
 Khan Ataur Rahman
 Satya Saha

References

External links
 Narayan Ghosh Mita at the Interner Movie Database

Bengali Hindus
Bangladeshi Hindus
Bangladeshi film directors
Bangladeshi film producers
Best Director National Film Award (Bangladesh) winners
Year of birth missing (living people)
Possibly living people
Bangladeshi women film producers